Leiocolea turbinata is a species of liverwort belonging to the family Jungermanniaceae.

Synonym:
 Jungermannia turbinata Raddi

References

Jungermanniales